Alexander Ravilevich Akmaldinov (born 23 June 1994) is a Kazakhstani-born Russian professional ice hockey centre who is currently playing for Yugra Khanty-Mansiysk of the Supreme Hockey League. He previously played in the Kontinental Hockey League for Yugra and HC Sochi.

Akmaldinov made his KHL debut with Yugra Khanty-Mansiysk during the 2015–16 KHL season. He signed with HC Spartak Moscow on September 8, 2015, but was released just three months later without ever playing a game for Spartak and he returned to Yugra. On October 20, 2017, Akmaldinov moved to HC Sochi. He was released from his contract by mutual consent on August 25, 2019.

References

External links

1994 births
Living people
Dizel Penza players
HC Ryazan players
HC Sochi players
Kazakhstani ice hockey players
Mamonty Yugry players
Rubin Tyumen players
Russian ice hockey centres
Sportspeople from Oskemen
HC Yugra players
Yuzhny Ural Orsk players